Yeh Raat Phir Na Aayegi may refer to:

 Yeh Raat Phir Na Aayegi (1966 film), a 1966 Bollywood film 
 Yeh Raat Phir Na Aayegi (1992 film), a 1992 Bollywood film